Enrico Chieffi (born 11 April 1963) is an Italian former yacht racer who competed in the 1984 Summer Olympics and in the 1996 Summer Olympics.

Chieffi was the navigator for Il Moro Challenge at the 1992 Louis Vuitton Cup. At the 2000 Louis Vuitton Cup, he sailed with the Swiss FAST 2000 challenge.

References

External links
 
 
 

1963 births
Living people
Italian male sailors (sport)
Olympic sailors of Italy
Sailors at the 1984 Summer Olympics – 470
Sailors at the 1996 Summer Olympics – Star
2000 America's Cup sailors
Star class world champions
World champions in sailing for Italy
Il Moro Challenge sailors
1992 America's Cup sailors
470 class world champions